The Robert Lafayette Cooper House is a historic house at 109 Campbell Street in Murphy, North Carolina.  The two story wood-frame house was built 1889–91, and is one of the finest Queen Anne Victorian houses in Cherokee County.  The house is roughly rectangular in mass, with a number of gable sections projecting from its hipped roof.  It has two octagonal cupolas, and an elaborately decorated porch which includes an octagonal corner section.  The house was built by Robert Lafayette Cooper, a successful local lawyer, as a wedding present for his wife.

The house was listed on the National Register of Historic Places in 1990.

See also
National Register of Historic Places listings in Cherokee County, North Carolina

References

Houses on the National Register of Historic Places in North Carolina
Queen Anne architecture in North Carolina
Houses completed in 1889
Houses in Cherokee County, North Carolina
National Register of Historic Places in Cherokee County, North Carolina